José Luis (born 1 October 1908 - deceased) was a  Portuguese footballer who played as forward.

Jose Luís gained 4 caps for Portugal and made his debut 1 December 1929 in Milan against Italy in a 1-6 defeat.

External links 
 
 
 

1908 births
Portuguese footballers
Association football forwards
Primeira Liga players
C.F. Os Belenenses players
Portugal international footballers
Year of death missing